The 2012–13 Atlético Madrid season was the 82nd season in the club's history. Atlético competed in La Liga, the Copa del Rey, and in the Europa League as defending champions. They were eliminated in the Round of 32 by Rubin Kazan. They won the Copa del Rey after beating rivals Real Madrid 2–1 in extra time.

On 1 September, Atlético beat English club Chelsea with a scoreline of 4–1 to win the UEFA Super Cup for the second time in three years.

Kits
Supplier: Nike / Main Sponsor: Huawei, later Azerbaijan / Back Sponsor: Kyocera

Pre-season and friendlies

Competitions

UEFA Super Cup

La Liga

League table

Results by round

Matches

Copa del Rey

Round of 32

Round of 16

Quarter-finals

Semi-finals

Final

UEFA Europa League

Group stage

Knockout phase

Round of 32

Squad
.

References

External links
 
2012–13 Atlético Madrid season at ESPN

Atletico Madrid
Atlético Madrid seasons
Atletico Madrid